Tsai Ming-Hung (born 2 September 1966) is a retired Taiwanese professional baseball player who competed in the 1992 Summer Olympics. He was part of the Chinese Taipei baseball team which won the silver medal. He is a right-handed submarine pitcher.

After the Barcelona Olympics Tsai joined China Times Eagles of the Chinese Professional Baseball League(CPBL). He left an unsatisfactory 3-win, 7-loss record during his three 1993~1995 seasons and was waived after the 1995 CPBL season. He currently runs small business in his home town Yunlin County.

External links
profile

1966 births
Living people
Asian Games competitors for Chinese Taipei
Baseball pitchers
Baseball players at the 1990 Asian Games
Baseball players at the 1992 Summer Olympics
China Times Eagles players
Medalists at the 1992 Summer Olympics
Olympic baseball players of Taiwan
Olympic medalists in baseball
Olympic silver medalists for Taiwan
People from Yunlin County
Taiwanese baseball players